The 2019 New Zealand Sevens was the third tournament within the 2018–19 World Rugby Sevens Series and the twentieth edition of the New Zealand Sevens. It was held on 26–27 January 2019 at FMG Stadium Waikato, Hamilton.

An invitational competition for women's teams, the Women's Fast Four, was held alongside the men's tournament as the precursor to fully integrated men's and women's tournaments planned for Hamilton in 2020.

Format
The teams are drawn into four pools of four teams each. Each team plays every other team in their pool once. The top two teams from each pool advance to the Cup bracket where teams compete for the Gold, Silver, and Bronze Medals. The bottom two teams from each group go to the Challenge Trophy bracket.

Teams
Fifteen core teams played in the tournament along with one invitational team, the highest-placing non-core team of the 2018 Oceania Sevens Championship, Tonga:

Pool stage
All times in New Zealand Daylight Time (UTC+13:00)

Pool A

Pool B

Pool C

Pool D

Knockout stage

Thirteenth place

Challenge Trophy

Fifth place

Cup

Tournament placings

Source: World Rugby

Players

Scoring leaders

Source: World Rugby

Dream Team
The following seven players were selected to the tournament Dream Team at the conclusion of the tournament:

See also
 World Rugby Sevens Series
 2018–19 World Rugby Sevens Series
 2019 New Zealand Women's Sevens Fast Four
 World Rugby

References

External links
 Tournament site
 World Rugby info

2019
2018–19 World Rugby Sevens Series
Sevens
January 2019 sports events in New Zealand